See You in the Morning is the third studio album by Mint Royale. It was released on the Faith & Hope label in 2005. It peaked at number 26 on the UK Independent Albums Chart.

Track listing

Charts

References

External links
 

2005 albums
Mint Royale albums
Big beat albums